Shinkin is a rural locality (a khutor) in Olshanskoye Rural Settlement, Ostrogozhsky District, Voronezh Oblast, Russia. The population was 166 as of 2010. There are 7 streets.

Geography 
Shinkin is located 28 km southwest of Ostrogozhsk (the district's administrative centre) by road. Nizhny Olshan is the nearest rural locality.

References 

Rural localities in Ostrogozhsky District